Quyuan Management District is a district in Yueyang, in the northeast of Hunan province, China, situated on the east (right) bank of the Xiang River. It was reorganized from the former State-run Farm of Quyuan in 2000. The district is a part of Miluo City and exercises its jurisdiction over a subdistrict, a township and 2 towns in Miluo City; however, it is directly under the administration of Yueyang prefecture-level city.

References

Miluo City
Township-level divisions of Hunan